Jaggi Singh may refer to:

 Jaggi Singh (activist) (born 1971), Canadian anti-globalization and social justice activist
 Jaggi Singh (actor) (born 1989), Punjabi actor and film producer